Tyson Apostol (born June 17, 1979) is an American reality television personality, best known for his appearances on multiple seasons of the CBS reality television show Survivor. Apostol originally competed on Survivor: Tocantins in 2009, finishing in 8th place. He returned as a villain on Survivor: Heroes vs. Villains in 2010 and came in 15th place. In 2013, he returned again and was eventually crowned the winner of Survivor: Blood vs. Water. Apostol competed for a fourth time on the show's 40th season Survivor: Winners at War, finishing in 11th place. He also competed on The Challenge: USA, a CBS spinoff of the MTV franchise.  

Apostol is a former professional cyclist and also appeared on Marriage Boot Camp: Reality Stars 2 with his partner, Rachel Foulger. He co-hosts three podcasts: News AF on Rob Has A Podcast, The Pod Has Spoken on The Ringer and PicklePod.

Personal life
Apostol was born in Provo, Utah, on June 17, 1979, and raised in Lindon, Utah. He spent two years in the Philippines as a missionary for the Church of Jesus Christ of Latter-day Saints. He attended Brigham Young University on a swimming scholarship, but did not graduate. Once back in the United States, he managed a Utah bicycle shop. 

Apostol proposed to his girlfriend of six and a half years, Rachel Foulger, during the finale of Marriage Boot Camp: Reality Stars 2. The episode aired on March 13, 2015. On March 15, 2015, Apostol and Foulger confirmed that in the time since filming Marriage Boot Camp, they had gotten married. Apostol's Survivor: Tocantins co-star, Stephen Fishbach, performed the private ceremony on February 8, 2015 in Utah. 

Foulger and Apostol have two daughters, Bergen (b. 2015) and Marlowe (b. 2018). He currently lives in Mesa, Arizona.

Survivor

Tocantins
On the 18th season of Survivor, Apostol was placed on the Timbira tribe, initially sticking with the majority alliance and forming a particularly close bond with Benjamin "Coach" Wade, who dubbed Apostol his "assistant coach". Early on, Apostol wanted to blindside fellow contestant Erinn Lobdell; however, he eventually sided with the majority and voted out the ill Jerry Sims. At the merge, Apostol won the first individual immunity by outlasting former tribemate Debbie Beebe. He went on to win immunity again with nine contestants left as well. Wade and Apostol aligned with Stephen Fishbach, James "J.T." Thomas, Jr., and Beebe, blindsiding Brendan Synnott with the cooperation of Lobdell and Tamara "Taj" Johnson-George. Sierra Reed became the target, but Thomas, Lobdell, and Fishbach joined the other group, deciding that Apostol was a bigger threat than Reed; Apostol was voted out and became the second juror. He eventually voted for Thomas to win the game.

Jeff Probst stated that Apostol was one of his favorites of the season because he was maniacal and unpredictable.

Heroes vs. Villains
Apostol accepted an offer to participate again, in the show's 20th season, where he was assigned to the Villains tribe. His tribe dominated the initial immunity challenges. He formed an alliance with Jerri Manthey and fellow Tocantins participant Benjamin "Coach" Wade. Apostol appeared to be safe after joining the alliance of "Boston Rob" Mariano, Sandra Diaz-Twine, and Courtney Yates, along with Wade and Manthey. This group held a majority over the bloc of Russell Hantz, Parvati Shallow, and Danielle DiLorenzo. When both the Heroes and Villains tribes had to vote someone out consecutively, Mariano directed his alliance to split their votes due to Hantz's possession of a hidden immunity idol. The plan was to have him, Mariano and Diaz-Twine vote to eliminate Hantz and Yates, Manthey and Wade vote to eliminate Shallow. If Hantz gave Shallow the idol or if Hantz did not play the idol at all, on the revote, Hantz would be eliminated. If Hantz played the idol for himself, on the revote, Shallow would be eliminated 4-3-0. Hantz manipulated Apostol into disobeying Mariano's plan, and instead of forcing a tie, Apostol switched his vote to Shallow. After Hantz gave Shallow the hidden immunity idol and she played it, Apostol was the sixth contestant eliminated by a vote of 3–2, with Hantz's idol negating four votes against Shallow.

If Apostol voted along Mariano's plan, he and Hantz would have tied 3–3, and Hantz would have been eliminated on the revote. Thus Apostol was the sixth survivor and the second Villain to be voted out of the season. His switching votes has been called "one of the dumbest moves in Survivor history." His vote switch caused huge ramifications on the game as Hantz and Shallow both would make it to the Final Tribal Council despite both losing to the more heroic, Diaz-Twine.

Blood vs. Water
Apostol returned for Survivors 27th season, Blood vs. Water. This time, he and his longtime girlfriend, Rachel Foulger, were both cast as contestants. He was assigned to the Galang tribe, while she went to Tadhana. Foulger was the third person eliminated from the game after being the second contestant to be voted out in a Tribal Council. 

Later on, a tribe switch put Apostol on a tribe with fellow former Galang members Gervase Peterson and Aras Baskauskas, as well as former Tadhana members Hayden Moss, Ciera Eastin, and Caleb Bankston. Using the clues to the hidden immunity idol's location, given to him verbally by Moss and Bankston, Apostol found the first idol by himself and kept it a secret. He also formed an alliance with Peterson, Moss, Eastin, and Bankston. At the merge, this alliance joined with Monica Culpepper and Eastin's mother, Laura Morett, to take out Baskauskas and his brother, Vytas, as well as Tina Wesson. From here, Apostol began looking further past this alliance of seven, orchestrating Morett's return to Redemption Island and voting out Bankston, who was conspiring to blindside him. In this Tribal Council, Apostol used his idol, even though no votes were cast against him and Bankston still received the majority of votes.

With the sudden revelation that he had had the idol all along, Apostol began facing rebellion within his alliance from Moss and Eastin, who continuously appealed to Culpepper to switch her vote and go with them to vote against Apostol and Peterson. However, Apostol maintained control of Peterson and Culpepper, and even found the idol a second time, utilizing the clue that Eastin was given. Apostol later won the final two immunity challenges, thus guaranteeing himself a spot in the final three.

He then decided to vote out former Survivor winner Wesson, who had just returned from Redemption Island, recognizing she was his only remaining threat for jury votes. Thus he went to the finals alongside the less-liked Peterson and Culpepper, who were both widely viewed by the jury as riding Apostol's coattails, letting him make all the decisions, and doing little to play their own games, with Culpepper especially being criticized for failing to make a big blindside move against Apostol and Peterson despite numerous opportunities to do so.  Culpepper was also razzed for her lack of social bonds with any of the other players outside of her alliance, and she broke down crying during Final Tribal Council. Though Apostol was responsible for most of the jury members' eliminations, his method of playing the game was praised, and he was voted the $1 million winner, receiving seven of the eight jury votes (with Culpepper receiving the dissenting vote, from Vytas Baskauskas).

Winners at War
Apostol once again came back for the show's 40th season, Winners at War. He was a member of the Dakal tribe. He was targeted by Yul Kwon early in the game for having close ties with other players outside the game, such as Rob Mariano and Kim Spradlin-Wolfe. After Dakal lost the fifth immunity challenge, Apostol became the fifth person voted off and went to the Edge of Extinction. He rejoined the game at the merge after winning the return challenge against the other Edge of Extinction contestants. However, Apostol was voted off again on day 25 and returned to the Edge of Extinction. He was defeated in the second return challenge by Natalie Anderson, for whom he later voted to win the season, though she would lose to Tyson's former Dakal tribemate Tony Vlachos, who won the season and became the second-ever two-time winner in Survivor history.

The Challenge
Apostol was a finalist on The Challenge: USA.

Filmography

Television

Poker 
Tyson Apostol started entering poker competitions around 2016. 

In 2018, Apostol appeared on the CBS Sports show Poker Night Live where he played a session of $5/$5 NLHE cash game with fellow Survivor cast members Boston Rob Mariano, Kim Spradlin, and Jeremy Collins. 

As of 2021 he has won $21,822 in live tournament winnings, in 9 different events.

References

External links

1979 births
Latter Day Saints from Utah
American male cyclists
American Mormon missionaries in the Philippines
Brigham Young University alumni
Living people
Survivor (American TV series) winners
People from Provo, Utah
People from Lindon, Utah
Cyclists from Utah
Winners in the Survivor franchise
The Challenge (TV series) contestants